Natalia Ponomareva (born 13 August 1982 in Yekaterinburg, Soviet Union (now Russia)) is a former pair skater who represented Uzbekistan. She competed with partner Evgeni Sviridov. They placed 18th at the 2002 Winter Olympics.

Results
(with Sviridov)

External links
 

Uzbekistani female pair skaters
Olympic figure skaters of Uzbekistan
Figure skaters at the 2002 Winter Olympics
1982 births
Living people
Asian Games medalists in figure skating
Figure skaters at the 1999 Asian Winter Games
Asian Games bronze medalists for Uzbekistan
Medalists at the 1999 Asian Winter Games